This is a general list of composers who have written music for the musical theatre along with their works organized by first production date.  This list primarily contains musicals, but also includes links to film adaptations.

For composers whose names fall into the A-L alphabetic range, see List of musicals by composer: A to L.

M 
 Tony Macaulay (born 1944)
     Windy City (1982)
 Galt MacDermot (1928–2018)
     My Fur Lady (1957)
     Hair (1967); also a 1979 film
     Isabel's a Jezebel (1970)
     Two Gentlemen of Verona (1971)
     Dude (1972)
     Via Galactica (1972)
     The Karl Marx Play (1973)
     It's Me Sylvia (1981)
     The Human Comedy (1983)
     The Legend of Joan of Arc (1997)
 Gunnar Madsen
     The Shaggs: Philosophy of the World (2011)
 Rusty Magee (1955–2003)
     Scapin (1993)
     The Czar of Rock and Roll
     The Green Heart (1997)
 Eaton "Bob" Magoon, Jr. (1922–2018)
     13 Daughters (1961)
     Heathen! (1972); also known as Aloha
     A Little Life Like This (1992)
 Dave Malloy (born 1976)
     Natasha, Pierre & The Great Comet of 1812 (2012)
 Chuck Malone
     Bucket of Blood (2009)
 The Mamas & the Papas
     Dream a Little Dream: The Mamas and Papas Musical (2003)
 Melissa Manchester (born 1951)
     I Sent a Letter to My Love (1995)
 Henry Mancini (1924–1994)
     Victor/Victoria (1995); music also by Frank Wildhorn; also a 1982 film
 Julie Mandel
     Two (1978)
 Mel Mandel
     My Old Friends (1979); music also by Norman Sachs
 Charles Mandracchia
     Valentino: The Musical (1998)
 Harry Manfredini (born 1943)
     Play Me a Country Song (1982); music also by John R. Briggs
 Barry Manilow (born 1943)
     Copacabana (1985)
 Samuel L. Manning (1899–1960)
     Caribbean Carnival (1947); music also by Adolph Thenstead
 Marcus Manske
     Pascal – Ein Musikalisches Märchen, music also by Ulrich Hinterberg
 Steven Margoshes
     Fame: The Musical (1989)
 Zane Mark
     Bring in 'Da Noise, Bring in 'Da Funk (1995); music also by Ann Duquesnay, Daryl Waters
     Harlem Song (2002); music also by Daryl Waters
     Imagine Tap! (2006)
 Denis Markell
     A Backer's Audition (1992); music also by Douglas Bernstein
 Gerald Jay Markoe (1941–2009)
     Charlotte Sweet (1982)
 Gerald Marks (1900–1997)
     Hold It! (1948)
 Walter Marks (born 1934)
     Bajour (1964)
     Go Fly a Kite (1966)
     Golden Rainbow (1968)
     Broadway Follies (1981)
     Body Shop (1994)
 Stephen Markwick
     The Secret Garden (1987)
 Bob Marley (1945–1981)
     One Love: The Bob Marley Musical (2015)
 Howard Marren
     Love (1984)
     What About Luv? (1991)
 Queen Esther Marrow (born 1941)
     Truly Blessed (1990)
 Sergio García Marruz
     The English Only Restaurant (1990); music also by Saul Spangenberg
 Henry Marsh (born 1948)
     Casper (1999); music also by Phil Pickett
 Tom Martel
     Hard Job Being God (1972)
 Dan Martin
     Breathe (1999)
 David Martin
     Simply Heavenly (1957)
 Hugh Martin (1914–2011)
     Best Foot Forward (1941); music also by Ralph Blane; also a 1943 film
     Look, Ma, I'm Dancin'! (1948)
     Make a Wish (1951)
     Love from Judy (1952)
     High Spirits (1964); music also by Timothy Gray
     Meet Me in St. Louis (1989); music also by Ralph Blane; also a 1944 film
 Margaret Martin
     Gone with the Wind (2008)
 Norman Martin
     From A to Z (1960); music also by others
     Put It in Writing (1963); music also by others
 Steve Martin (born 1945)
     Bright Star (2014); music also by Edie Brickell
 Vinnie Martucci
     Clue: The Musical (1997); music also by Galen Blum, Wayne Barker
 Mel Marvin (born 1941)
     Green Pond (1977)
     A History of the American Film (1978)
     Constance and the Musician (1981)
     The Portable Pioneer and Prairie Show (1997)
     Dr. Seuss' How the Grinch Stole Christmas! (1998); music also by Albert Hague
     True History and Real Adventures (1999)
 Jeff Marx (born 1970)
     Avenue Q (2003); music also by Robert Lopez
 Hugh Masekela (1939–2018)
     Sarafina! (1987); additional songs by Mbongeni Ngema
 William Mathieu (born 1937)
     From the Second City (1961)
 Todd Matshikiza (1921–1968)
     King Kong (1959)
 Griffin Matthews
     Witness Uganda (2014); music also by Matt Gould
 Simon May (born 1944)
     Smike (1973); music also by Roger Holman
 William May
     Always (1997); music also by Jason Sprague
 Amanda McBroom (born 1947)
     Heartbeats (1989); music by Gerald Sternbach, Michele Brourman, Tom Snow
 Paul McCartney (born 1942)
     Beatlemania (1977); music also by John Lennon
     Norwegian Wood (1988); music also by John Lennon
 Ian McCluskey
     Tony! The Blair Musical (2007)
 Rob McCulloch
     Attorney for the Damned (2008)
 Hugh McDonald
     Cambridge Circus (1963); music also by Bill Oddie, David Palmer
 James McDonald
     Something's Afoot (1976); music also by David Vos, Robert Gerlach
 James McDowell
     The Wind and the Willows (1997)
 Jack McElwaine
     Der Ring Gott Farblonjet (1977)
 Ian McFarlane
     Betwixt! (2008)
 Ronnie McGhee
     Monkey Business (2009)
 Christopher McGovern
     Lizzie Borden (1998)
 Jimmy McHugh (1894–1969)
     Blackbirds of 1928 (1928)
     Hello, Daddy (1928)
     International Revue (1930)
     The Vanderbilt Revue (1930); music also by others
     The Streets of Paris (1939)
     Keep Off the Grass (1940)
     As the Girls Go (1948)
     Sugar Babies (1979); music also by others
     Lucky in the Rain (1997)
 Branice McKenzie
     Shades of Harlem (1983); music also by Frank Owens, Ty Stephens, Jeree Wade
 Paul McKibbin
     The It Girl (2001)
 Barri McPherson
     Brooklyn (2004); music also by Mark Schoenfeld
 Mitch McVicker
     Canticle of the Plains (1997); music also by Rich Mullins, Beaker
 Adam Meggido (born 1970)
     Saucy Jack and the Space Vixens (1998); music also by Robin Forrest, Jonathan Croose
 James J. Mellon
     An Unfinished Song (1991)
 Peter Melnick (born 1958)
     Adrift in Macao (2005)
     The Last Smoker in America (2010)
 Ronald Melrose
     Fourtune (1980)
 Alan Menken (born 1949)
     God Bless You, Mr. Rosewater (1979)
     Little Shop of Horrors (1982)
     Weird Romance (1992)
     Beauty and the Beast (1993)
     A Christmas Carol (1994); also a 2004 television film
     Hundreds of Hats (1995); music also by Marvin Hamlisch, Jonathan Sheffer
     King David (1997)
     Der Glöckner von Notre Dame (1999); German musical based on the 1996 Disney film The Hunchback of Notre Dame
     Sister Act (2006)
     The Little Mermaid (2007)
     Leap of Faith (2010)
     Aladdin (2011); also a 1992 animated film
     Newsies (2011); also a 1992 film
     The Apprenticeship of Duddy Kravitz (2015)
     A Bronx Tale (2016)
     Hercules (2019); also a 1997 animated film
 Gian Carlo Menotti (1911–2007)
     Maria Golovin (1958)
 Dale Menten
     The House of Leather (1970)
 Johnny Mercer (1909–1976)
     Top Banana (1951)
 Sandi Merle
     3 From Brooklyn (1992); music also by Steve Michaels
 Bob Merrill (1921–1998)
     New Girl in Town (1957)
     Take Me Along (1959)
     Carnival! (1961)
     Breakfast at Tiffany's (1966)
     Henry, Sweet Henry (1967)
     Hannah... 1939 (1990)
 Stephin Merritt (born 1966)
     Coraline (2009)
 Daniel Messé (born 1968)
     Amélie (2015)
 Dede Meyer
     She Shall Have Music (1959)
 Joseph Meyer (1894–1987)
     Big Boy (1925); music also by James F. Hanley
     Sweetheart Time (1926); music also by Walter Donaldson
     Just Fancy (1927); music also by Philip Charig
     Here's Howe (1928); music also by Roger Wolfe Kahn
     That's a Good Girl (1928); music also by Philip Charig
     Lady Fingers (1929)
     Jonica (1930)
     Shuffle Along of 1952 (1952); music also by Eubie Blake
 Jan Meyerowitz (1913–1998)
     The Barrier (1950)
 Richard Meyers
     Americana (1932); music also by Jay Gorney, Harold Arlen, Herman Hupfeld
 Sylvain Meyniac
     La belle et la bête (1999)
 Chip Meyreilles
     Stars in Your Eyes (1999)
 Steve Michaels
     3 From Brooklyn (1992); music also by Sandi Merle
 Brendan Milburn
     Striking 12 (2006); music also by Gene Lewin, Valerie Vigoda
 Charles Miller
     When Midnight Strikes (2007)
 Chris Miller
     The Burnt Part Boys (2009)
     Tuck Everlasting (2015)
 Helen Miller (1925–2006)
     Inner City (1971)
 Roger Miller (1936–1992)
     Big River (1985)
 Peter Mills
     The Pursuit of Persephone (2005)
     Golden Boy of the Blue Ridge (2009)
 Mark Milner
     Tinseltown (1981)
 Tim Minchin (born 1975)
     Matilda (2010)
     Groundhog Day (2015)
 Lin-Manuel Miranda (born 1980)
     In the Heights (2007)
     Bring It On (2011); music also by Tom Kitt
     Hamilton (2015)
 Cass Morgan
     Pump Boys and Dinettes (1981); music also by others
 Lionel Monckton (1861–1924)
     A Greek Slave (1898); music also by Sidney Jones
     A Runaway Girl (1898); music also by Ivan Caryll
     San Toy (1899); music also by Sidney Jones
     A Country Girl (1902); music also by Paul Rubens
     The Cingalee (1904); music also by Paul Rubens
     The Arcadians (1909); music also by Howard Talbot
     Our Miss Gibbs (1909); music also by Ivan Caryll
     The Quaker Girl (1910)
     The Boy (1917); music also by Howard Talbot
 Debra Monk (born 1949)
     Pump Boys and Dinettes (1981); music also by others
     Oil City Symphony (1986); music also by Mike Craver, Mark Hardwick, Mary Murfitt
 Marguerite Monnot (1903–1961)
     Irma La Douce (1956)
 Andy Monroe
     The Kid (2010)
 Bruce Montgomery (1927–2008)
     The Amorous Flea (1964)
 Dudley Moore (1935–2002)
     Beyond the Fringe (1960)
     Behind the Fridge (1972)
 Jerome Moross (1913–1983)
     Parade (1935)
     Ballet Ballades (1948)
     The Golden Apple (1954)
 John Morris (1926–2018)
     A Time for Singing (1966)
 Melissa Morris
     Evil Dead: The Musical (2006); music also by Christopher Bond, Frank Cipolla, George Reinblatt
 Robert Morris
     White Noise: A Cautionary Musical (2011); music also by Steven Morris, Joe Shane
 Steven Morris
     White Noise: A Cautionary Musical (2011); music also by Robert Morris, Joe Shane
 Greg Morrison (born 1965)
     The Drowsy Chaperone (2006); music also by Lisa Lambert
 Woolson Morse (1858–1897)
     School, or The Charity Pupil (1880)
     Cinderella at School (1881)
     Madame Piper (1884)
     The Merry Monarch (1890)
     Wang (1891)
     Panjandrum (1893)
     Dr. Syntax (1894); revision of Cinderella at School
     Lost, Strayed or Stolen (1896)
 Jelly Roll Morton (1890–1941)
     Jelly's Last Jam (1992); music also by Luther Henderson
     Jelly Roll! (1994)
 Al Moss
     Tis of Thee (1940); music also by Alex North
 Jeffery Moss (1942–1998)
     Double Feature (1981)
 Otto Motzan (1880–1937)
     The Show of Wonders (1916); music also by Sigmund Romberg, Herman Timberg
     The Passing Show of 1916 (1916); music also by Sigmund Romberg
     The Passing Show of 1917 (1917); music also by Sigmund Romberg
 Mark Mulcahy
     The Slug Bearers of Kayrol Island (or the Friends of Dr. Rushower) (2004)
 Lance Mulcahy (1931–1995)
     One over the Eight (1961)
     Park (1970)
     The Duenna (1980)
     Shakespeare's Cabaret (1980)
     Keystone (1981)
     Sweet Will (1984)
 Ernst Muller
     Professionally Speaking (1986); music also by Frederic Block, Peter Winkler
 Timothy Muller
     Blair on Broadway (2007)
 Rich Mullins (1955–1997)
     Canticle of the Plains (1997); music also by Mitch McVicker, Beaker
 James Mundy (1907–1983)
     The Vamp (1955)
 John Mundy (1886–1971)
     The Liar (1950)
 James "Jim" Murdock
     Sparkles (1981)
 Mary Murfitt
     Oil City Symphony (1986); music also by Mike Craver, Mark Hardwick, Debra Monk
     Cowgirls (1996)
 Kevin Murphy (born 1967)
     Heathers (2010); music also by Laurence O'Keefe
 Owen Murphy (1893–1965)
     Rain or Shine (1929); music also by Milton Ager
 Ted Murray
     Take a Bow (1944); music also by Benny Davis
 Romano Musumarro
     Cindy – Cendrillo 2002 (2002)
 Richard Myers (1901–1977)
     Mr. Cinders (1929); music also by Vivian Ellis

N 
 Paul Nassau (1930–2013)
     A Joyful Noise (1966); music also by Oscar Brand
     The Education of H*Y*M*A*N K*A*P*L*A*N (1968); music also by Oscar Brand
 Robert Lindsey Nassif
     Honky-Tonk Highway (1994)
     Opal (1992)
     3hree – The Flight of the Lawnchair Man (2000); musicals also by Laurence O'Keefe, John Bucchino
 Wesley Naylor
     Mama, I Want to Sing! Part 2 (1990)
     Born to Sing (1996)
 David Nehls (b. 1964)
     The Great American Trailer Park Musical (2005)
 Portia Nelson (1920–2001)
     Almost Crazy (1955); music also by James Shelton, Raymond Taylor
 Anthony Newley (1931–1999)
     Stop the World – I Want to Get Off (1961); music also by Leslie Bricusse
     The Roar of the Greasepaint – The Smell of the Crowd (1965); music also by Leslie Bricusse
     The Good Old Bad Old Days (1972); music also by Leslie Bricusse
 Randy Newman (born 1943)
     Maybe I'm Doing It Wrong (1982)
     Faust (1993)
     The Education of Randy Newman (2000)
 Mbongeni Ngema (born 1955)
     Sarafina! (1987); additional songs by Hugh Masekela
 David Nield (born 1941)
     Tin Pan Ali (1979)
     The Ragged Child (1988)
 Harry Nilsson (1942–1994)
     The Point! (1976)
 Monty Norman (1928–2022)
     Expresso Bongo (1958); music also by David Heneker
     Make Me an Offer (1959); music also by David Heneker
     The Art of Living (1960); music also by David Heneker
     Belle, or the Ballade of Dr. Crippen (1961)
     Songbook (1979); Broadway title: The Moony Shapiro Songbook (1981)
     Poppy (1982)
 Alex North (1910–1991)
     Tis of Thee (1940); music also by Al Moss
 Frederic Norton (1869–1946)
     Chu Chin Chow (1916)
 Vaclav Novák
     Bůh anebo Ďábel
 Ivor Novello (1893–1951)
     Theodore & Co (1917); music also by Jerome Kern
     Glamorous Night (1935)
     Careless Rapture (1936)
     Crest of the Wave (1937)
     The Dancing Years (1939)
     Perchance to Dream (1945)
     King's Rhapsody (1949)
     Gay's the Word (1950)
 Mark Nutter
     Wild Men! (1993)
     The Bicycle Men (2007)

O 
 Ben Oakland (1907–1979)
     Hold Your Horses (1933)
 John Thomas Oaks
     Star Queen (1995)
 Richard Oberacker
     Ace (2006)
     Bandstand (2015)
 Pascal Obispo (born 1965)
     Les Dix Commandements (2000)
 Richard O'Brien (born 1942)
     The Rocky Horror Show (1973)
     The Rocky Horror Picture Show (1975 film)
 Desmond O'Connor (born 1972)
     Failed States (2006)
 Bill Oddie (born 1941)
     Cambridge Circus (1963); music also by Hugh McDonald, David Palmer
 Jacques Offenbach (1819–1880)
     The Happiest Girl in the World (1961)
 Michael James Ogborn
     Box Office of the Damned (1994)
 Tom O'Horgan (1924–2009)
     Senator Joe (1989)
 Laurence O'Keefe (born 1969)
     Bat Boy (1997)
     La Cava (2000); music also by Stephen Keeling
     3hree – The Mice (2000); musicals also by John Bucchino, Robert Lindsey Nassif
     Sarah, Plain and Tall (2002)
     Cam Jansen (2004); music also by Nell Benjamin
     Legally Blonde (2007); music also by Nell Benjamin
     Heathers (2010); music also by Kevin Murphy
 Stephen Oliver (1950–1992)
     The Life and Adventures of Nicholas Nickleby (1980)
     Peter Pan (1982)
     Blondel (1983)
 James Olm
     The Magdalene (2011)
 Yoko Ono (born 1933)
     New York Rock (1994)
 The Open Window (Robert Dennis, Peter Schickele, Stanley Walden)
     Oh! Calcutta! (1969)
 Giuseppe Operti (1824?–1886)
     The Black Crook (1866); music also by George Bickwell, Thomas Baker
 Roy Orbison (1936–1988)
     Only the Lonely: The Roy Orbison Story (1993); music also by others
 Harold Orlob (1883–1982)
     Hairpin Harmony (1943)
 Cyril Ornadel (1924–2011)
     Pickwick (1963)
     Ann Veronica (1969)
     Treasure Island (1973)
     Great Expectations (1975)
 Will Ortman
     Holka Polka (1925)
     Cherry Blossoms (1927); music also by Sigmund Romberg
 Mike Oster
     Disappearing Act (1996)
 Frank Owens
     Shades of Harlem (1983); music also by Ty Stephens, Jeree Wade, Branice McKenzie

P 
 Herbert Pagani (1944–1988)
     Megalopolis (1972)
 Morty Palitz (1909–1962)
     Clues to a Life (1981); music also by Alec Wilder
 David Palmer
     Cambridge Circus (1963); music also by Bill Oddie, Hugh McDonald
 Jim Parker (born 1934)
     Follow the Star (1975)
 Trey Parker (born 1969)
     The Book of Mormon (2011); music also by Matt Stone and Robert Lopez
 Harry Parr-Davies (1914–1955)
     The Lisbon Story (1943)
 Leon Parris (born 1981)
     Wolfboy (2009)
 Dolly Parton (born 1946)
     9 to 5 (2008)
 Milton Pascal (1908–1976)
     Artists and Models of 1943 (1943); music also by  Philip Charig, Dan Shapiro
     Follow the Girls (1944); music also by Dan Shapiro, Philip Charig
 Benj Pasek (born 1985)
     Edges (2005); music also by Justin Paul
     A Christmas Story (2010); music also by Justin Paul
     James and the Giant Peach (2010); music also by Justin Paul
     Dogfight (2012); music also by Justin Paul
     Dear Evan Hansen (2015); music also by Justin Paul
 Václav Patejdl (born 1954)
     Jozef a jeho zázračný farebný plášť (1994)
     Grand Pierrot (1995)
     Adam Šangala (2003)
     Jack Rozparovač (2006)
 Bobby Paul (born 1959)
     The Rise of David Levinsky (1987)
 Justin Paul (born 1985)
     Edges (2005); music also by Benj Pasek
     A Christmas Story (2010); music also by Benj Pasek
     James and the Giant Peach (2010); music also by Benj Pasek
     Dogfight (2012); music also by Benj Pasek
     Dear Evan Hansen (2015); music also by Benj Pasek
 Michal Pavlíček (born 1956)
     Excalibur (2003)
 Glenn Paxton
     First Impressions (1959); music also by Robert Goldman, George David Weiss
 Richard Peaslee (1930–2016)
     Marat/Sade (1965)
     US (1966)
     Boccaccio (1975)
     Miracolo D'Amore (1988)
 Ron Pember (1934–2022)
     Jack the Ripper (1974)
 Polly Pen (born 1954)
     Goblin Market (1985)
     Christina Alberta's Father (1994)
     Bed and Sofa (1996)
 Hugo Peretti (1916–1986)
     Maggie Flynn (1968); music also by Luigi Creatore, George David Weiss
 Claudia Perry
     Queen of Hearts
 William P. Perry (born 1930)
     On the Double (1946)
     Xanadu: The Marco Polo Musical (1953)
     Happily Ever After (1967)
     Wind in the Willows (1985)
     Mark Twain (1987)
 Benj Pasek
     Edges (2005); music also by Justin Paul
     A Christmas Story (2010); music also by Justin Paul
     James and the Giant Peach (2010); music also by Justin Paul
     Dogfight (2012); music also by Justin Paul
 William Frederick Peters
     The Passing Show of 1915 (1915); music also by Leo Edwards, J. Leubrie Hill
 Taliep Petersen (1950–2006)
     District Six (1987)
     Fairyland (1991)
     Kat and the Kings (1997)
 Angela Peterson
     The Dragonslayers (1980)
 Eric Peterson (born 1946)
     Billy Bishop Goes to War (1978); music also by John MacLachlan Gray
 Pet Shop Boys – Neil Tennant (born 1954), Chris Lowe (born 1959)
     Closer to Heaven (2001)
 Carl Pflueger (1850–1901)
     1492 Up to Date (1892)
 Adolf Philipp (1864–1936)
     Alma, Where Do You Live? (1910)
     Teresa, Be Mine (1910)
     Auction Pinochle (1912)
     Adele (1913)
     The Midnight Girl (1914)
     The Girl Who Smiles (1915)
     Two Is Company (1915)
 John Phillips (1935–2001) of The Mamas & the Papas
     Man on the Moon (1975)
 Paul Phillips
     Jayson (1998); music also by Ron Romanovsky
 Ástor Piazzolla (1921–1992)
     Dangerous Games (1989)
 Phil Pickett (born 1946)
     Casper (1999); music also by Henry Marsh
 Peter Pinne (born 1937)
Caroline (1971)
     A Bunch of Ratbags (2005)
 Don Pippin (1926–2022)
     Fashion (1974)
 Robert Planquette (1848–1903)
     Les cloches de Corneville (1877); English title The Chimes of Normandy
 Leon Pober (1920–1971)
     Beg, Borrow or Steal (1960)
 Lee Pockriss (1924–2011)
     Ernest in Love (1960)
     Tovarich (1963)
 Ray Pohlman (1930–1990)
     Catch My Soul (1968); music also by Emil Dean Zoghby
 Dave Pollecutt
     African Footprint (2000)
 Tom Polum
     Pilgrim Souls (1997)
 David Pomeranz (born 1951)
     Time (1986); music also by Jeff Daniels
     Little Tramp (1992)
     A Tale of Two Cities (1998)
     Scandalous: The Life and Trials of Aimee Semple McPherson (2005); also known as Saving Aimee; music also by David Friedman
 Pooh
     Pinocchio: Il Grande Musical (2003)
 Brian Portelli
     Hillbrow (2004)
 Cole Porter (1891–1964)
     See America First (1916)
     Hitchy-Koo of 1919 (1919)
     The Greenwich Village Follies of 1924 (1924)
     Paris (1928); music also by Walter Kollo, Harry Warren, Louis Alter, Fred E. Ahlert
     Fifty Million Frenchmen (1929)
     Wake Up and Dream! (1929); music also by others
     The New Yorkers (1930)
     Gay Divorce (1932)
     Nymph Errant (1933)
     Anything Goes (1934)
     Jubilee (1935)
     Red, Hot and Blue! (1936)
     Rosalie (1937 film)
     You Never Know (1938); music also by 
     Leave It to Me! (1938)
     DuBarry Was a Lady (1939); also a 1943 film
     Panama Hattie (1940); also a 1942 film
     Let's Face It! (1941)
     Something for the Boys (1943)
     Mexican Hayride (1944); also a 1948 film
     Seven Lively Arts (1944)
     Around the World (1946)
     Kiss Me, Kate (1948); also a 1953 film
     Out of This World (1950)
     Can-Can (1953); also a 1960 film
     Silk Stockings (1955)
     Les Girls (1957 film)
     Aladdin (1958); television musical
     The Decline and Fall of the Entire World as Seen through the Eyes of Cole Porter (1965)
     Cole (1974)
     Unsung Cole (1977)
     Happy New Year (1980)
     Wodka Cola (1986); German version of 1938 musical Leave It to Me!
     High Society (1987); also a 1956 film
     A Swell Party (1991)
     Let's Do It! (1994); music also by Noël Coward
     You're the Top (1995)
     Porterphiles (2002)
     Love, Linda: The Life of Mrs. Cole Porter (2009)
 Garth Porter (born 1948)
     The Man from Snowy River (2002); music also by Bruce Rowland, Lee Kernaghan
 Rachel Portman (born 1960)
     Little House on the Prairie (2008)
 Mischa Portnoff (1901–1979)
     Happy As Larry (1950); music also by Wesley Portnoff
 Wesley Portnoff (1900–1969)
     Happy As Larry (1950); music also by Mischa Portnoff
 Gary Portnoy (born 1956)
     Preppies (1983); music also by Judy Hart Angelo
 George Posford (1906–1976)
     Goodnight, Vienna (1931)
     Balalaika (1936); music also by Bernard Grün
     Evangeline (1946); music also by Harry Jacobson
     Her Excellency (1949); co-composed with Manning Sherwin
     Zip Goes a Million (1951)
     Happy Holiday (1954)
 Matthew Potger
     The Last Laugh (1995)
 Nick Powell
     The Wolves in the Walls (2006)
 Will Power
     The Seven (2006); additional music by Justin Ellington and Will Hammond
 Gérard Presgurvic (born 1953)
     Roméo et Juliette, de la Haine à l'Amour (2001)
     Autant en emport le vent (2003)
 André Previn (1929–2019)
     A Party with Betty Comden and Adolph Green (1958); music also by Leonard Bernstein, Jule Styne, Saul Chaplin, Roger Edens
     Coco (1969)
     The Good Companions (1974)
 Alan Price (born 1942)
     Andy Capp (1982)
 Jonathan Price
     Escape from Eldorado (1990)
     Rumpelstiltskin (1990)
     Dead Poets (1990)
     Who Killed Cock Robin (1991)
     Lao Jiu (老九) (2005)
 Matthew Pritchard
     Ripper The Musical (2007); music also by Gerry Ware
 Bradford Proctor
     Bunked! (2010)

Q 
 Queen
     We Will Rock You (2002)
 James Quinn (born 1936)
     Do Black Patent Leather Shoes Really Reflect Up? (1982); music also by Alaric Jans

R 
 Sergei Rachmaninov (1873–1943)
     Anya, "Anastasia" (1965); music adapted by Robert Wright, George Forrest
     Anastasia (revision of Anya) (1991); music adapted by Robert Wright, George Forrest
 Peter Rafelson (born 1960)
     Voyeurz (1996); music also by Michael J. Lewis
 Alexander Rahbari (born 1948)
     Exta$y: The Musical to Die For (1996)
 A. R. Rahman (born 1966)
     Bombay Dreams (2002)
     The Lord of the Rings (2006); music also by Värttinä
 David Raksin (1912–2004)
     If the Shoe Fits (1946)
 Ramiro Ramirez
     Sancocho (1979); music also by Jimmy Justice
 Joe Raposo (1937–1989)
     Sing Muse! (1961)
     Raggedy Ann (1986)
     A Wonderful Life (1991)
 Michael Rapp
     Quasimodo, Prince of Fools (1996)
 Mark Razovsky
     Strider: The Story of a Horse (1979); music also by S. Vetkin, Norman L. Berman
 Mike Read (born 1947)
     Young Apollo
     Oscar
     Great Expectations (1993)
     A Christmas Carol (2000)
     Cliff (2003)
     Ricky Nelson...Teenage Idol
     Betjeman
 Robert Reale (born 1956)
     The Dinosaur Musical
     Quark Victory
     Once around the City (2001)
     A Year with Frog and Toad (2002)
     Johnny Baseball: The New Red Sox Musical (2010)
 Zachary Redler
     Perez Hilton Saves the Universe (or at Least the Greater Los Angeles Area) (2008)
 Skip Redwine (1926–1987)
     Frank Merriwell: Honor Challenged (1971); music also by Larry Frank
 Les Reed (1935–2019)
     Beautiful and Damned (2004); music also by Roger Cook
 David Reeves
     Cyrano (1996)
     Seven Little Australians (1988)
 Marcus Reeves (born 1979)
     Postcards from God (2007)
 Ilene Reid
     Bingo (2005); music also by Michael Heitzman, David Holcenberg
 Mike Reid (born 1947)
     Different Fields (1996)
 George Reinblatt (born 1977)
     Evil Dead: The Musical (2006); music also by Christopher Bond, Frank Cipolla, Melissa Morris
 Aladár Rényi (1885–1944)
     Suzi (1914)
 Harry Revel (1905–1958)
     Are You with It? (1945)
 Rudi Revil (1916–1983)
     Crazy with the Heat (1941); music also by Irvin Graham, Dana Suesse
 Edward E. Rice (1849–1924)
     Evangeline (1874)
     Adonis (1884); music also by John Eller
 Claibe Richardson (1929–2003)
     The Grass Harp (1971)
     Lola (1982)
     The Night of the Hunter (1998)
     Saturday Night at Grossinger's (2003)
 Jeff Richmond (born 1961)
     Mean Girls (2017)
 Lynne Riley
     Drake's Dream (1977); music also by Richard Riley
 Richard Riley
     Drake's Dream (1977); music also by Lynne Riley
 Allan Roberts (1905–1966)
     All for Love (1949); music also by Lester Lee
 Andy Roberts (born 1946)
     Censored Scenes from King Kong (1980)
 Bob Roberts
     Tom Jones (1964)
 Jimmy Roberts
     I Love You, You're Perfect, Now Change (1996)
     The Thing About Men (2003)
 Michael Roberts
     Golf: The Musical (2003)
     The Fartiste (2006)
     My American Family (2008)
 John Robinson
     Behind the Iron Mask (2005)
     Too Close to the Sun (2009)
 Phylliss K. Robinson
     Angel Levine (1995)
 Alfred G. Robyn (1860–1935)
     Pretty Mrs. Smith (1914)
     All for the Ladies (1913)
     The Yankee Tourist (1907)
     Princess Beggar (1907)
     The Yankee Consul (1904); also a 1924 film
 Eric Rockwell
     The Musical of Musicals (The Musical!) (2005)
 Heidi Rodewald
     Passing Strange (2008); music also by Stew
 Mary Rodgers (1931–2014)
     Once Upon a Mattress (1959)
     From A to Z (1960); music also by others
     Hot Spot (1963); music also by Stephen Sondheim
     The Mad Show (1966)
     Working (1978); music also by Stephen Schwartz, James Taylor, Craig Carnelia, Micki Grant
     Davy Jones' Locker (1987)
     Hey, Love (1996)
 Richard Rodgers (1902–1979)
     One Minute Please
     Fly with Me (1920)
     Poor Little Ritz Girl (1920); music also by Sigmund Romberg
     The Melody Man (1924)
     The Garrick Gaieties (1925)
     Dearest Enemy (1925)
     The Girl Friend (1926)
     The Garrick Gaieties (1926)
     Peggy-Ann (1926)
     Betsy (1926)
     A Connecticut Yankee (1927)
     She's My Baby (1928)
     Present Arms (1928)
     Chee-Chee (1928)
     Spring Is Here (1929)
     Heads Up! (1929)
     Ever Green (1930)
     Simple Simon (1930)
     America's Sweetheart (1931)
     Jumbo (1935)
     On Your Toes (1936)
     Babes in Arms (1937)
     I'd Rather Be Right (1937)
     I Married an Angel (1938); also a 1942 film
     The Boys from Syracuse (1938); also a 1940 film
     Too Many Girls (1939)
     Higher and Higher (1940)
     Pal Joey (1940); also a 1957 film
     By Jupiter (1942)
     Oklahoma! (1943); also a 1955 film
     Carousel (1945); also a 1956 film
     Allegro (1947)
     South Pacific (1949); also a 1958 film
     The King and I (1951); also a 1956 film
     Me and Juliet (1953)
     Pipe Dream (1955)
     Cinderella (1957); television musical
     Flower Drum Song (1958); also a 1961 film
     The Sound of Music (1959); also a 1965 film
     No Strings (1962)
     Do I Hear a Waltz? (1965)
     Two by Two (1970)
     Rodgers & Hart (1975)
     Rex (1976)
     I Remember Mama (1979)
     A Grand Night for Singing (1993)
     State Fair (1996); also 1945 and 1962 films
     Beguiled Again (1997)
 Andrew Rohn
     Walmartopia (2007)
 Ron Romanovsky
     Jayson (1998); music also by Paul Phillips
 Sigmund Romberg (1887–1951)
     The Whirl of the Wind (1914)
     The Passing Show of 1914 (1914); music also by Harry Carroll
     Dancing Around (1914); music also by Harry Carroll
     Maid in America (1915); music also by Harry Carroll
     Hands Up (1915); music also by E. Ray Goetz
     The Blue Paradise (1915); music also by Edmund Eysler
     A World of Pleasure (1915)
     Robinson Crusoe, Jr. (1916); music also by James F. Hanley
     The Passing Show of 1916 (1916); music also by Otto Motzan
     The Girl from Brazil (1916); music also by Robert Winterberg
     The Show of Wonders (1916); music also by Otto Motzan, Herman Timberg
     Follow Me (1916); additional music by others
     Her Soldier Boy (1916); music also by Emmerich Kálmán
     The Passing Show of 1917 (1917); music also by Otto Motzan
     My Lady's Glove (1917); music also by Oscar Straus
     Maytime (1917)
     Doing Our Bit (1917); music also by Herman Timberg
     Over the Top (1917)
     Sinbad (1918); music also by George Gershwin and others
     The Passing Show of 1918 (1918); music also by Jean Schwartz
     The Melting of Molly (1918)
     Monte Cristo Jr. (1919); music also by Jean Schwartz
     The Passing Show of 1919 (1919)
     The Magic Melody (1919)
     Poor Little Ritz Girl (1920); music also by Richard Rodgers
     Love Birds (1921)
     Blossom Time (1921); music adapted from themes of Franz Schubert
     Bombo (1921); music also by others
     The Blushing Bride (1922)
     The Rose of Stamboul (1922); music also by Leo Fall
     Springtime of Youth (1922); music also by Walter Kollo
     The Dancing Girl (1923)
     The Passing Show of 1923 (1923); music also by Jean Schwartz
     Innocent Eyes (1924); music also by Jean Schwartz
     Marjorie (1924); music also by Herbert Stothart, Philip Culkin, Stephen Jones
     The Passing Show of 1924 (1924); music also by Jean Schwartz
     Artists and Models of 1924 (1924); music also by J. Fred Coots
     The Student Prince (1924)
     Louie the 14th (1925)
     Artists and Models of 1925 (1925); music also by Alfred Goodman, J. Fred Coots, Maurice Rubens
     Princess Flavia (1925)
     The Desert Song (1926)
     Cherry Blossoms (1927); music also by Will Ortman
     My Maryland (1927)
     My Princess (1927)
     The Love Call (1927)
     Rosalie (1928); music also by George Gershwin
     The New Moon (1928)
     Nina Rosa (1930)
     East Wind (1931)
     Melody (1933)
     May Wine (1935)
     Forbidden Melody (1936)
     Sunny River (1941)
     Up in Central Park (1945)
     My Romance (1948)
     The Girl in Pink Tights (1954)
 Harold J. Rome (1908–1993)
     Pins and Needles (1937)
     Sing Out the News (1938)
     Let Freedom Sing (1942)
     Call Me Mister (1946)
     Bless You All (1950)
     Wish You Were Here (1952)
     Fanny (1954)
     Destry Rides Again (1959)
     I Can Get It for You Wholesale (1962)
     Harold Rome's Gallery (1964)
     The Zulu and the Zayda (1965)
     Scarlett (1970); 1972 London Title: Gone with the Wind
 Ann Ronell (1906–1993)
     Count Me In (1942)
 Patrick Rose
     Jubalay (1974)
     A Bistro Car on the CNR (1978)
 Joshua Rosenblum (born 1963)
     Fermat's Last Tango (2000)
     Bush Is Bad (2005)
 Milton Rosenstock (1917–1992)
     Nash at Nine (1973)
 Laurence Rosenthal (born 1926)
     Sherry! (1967)
 Charles Rosoff (1895–1988)
     Earl Carroll's Vanities of 1940 (1940); music also by Peter DeRose
 Brad Ross
     Little by Little (1999)
 Jerry Ross (1926–1955)
     John Murray Anderson's Almanac (1953); music also by Richard Adler and others
     The Pajama Game (1954); music also by Richard Adler; also a 1975 film
     Damn Yankees (1955); music also by Richard Adler; also a 1958 film
 Robbie Roth
     Flashdance (2008)
 Dana P. Rowe (born 1957)
     Zombie Prom (1996)
     The Fix (1997)
     The Witches of Eastwick (2000)
     The Ballad of Bonnie and Clyde (2005)
     Brother Russia (2012)
 Bruce Rowland (born 1942)
     The Man from Snowy River (2002); music also by Lee Kernaghan, Garth Porter
 William Roy (1928–2003)
     Maggie (1953)
     The Penny Friend (1966)
 Maurice "Maurie" Rubens (1893–1948)
     Artists and Models of 1925 (1925); music also by J. Fred Coots, Alfred Goodman, Sigmund Romberg
     A Night in Paris (1926); music also by J. Fred Coots
     Artists and Models of 1927 (1927); music also by Harry Akst
 Paul Rubens (1875–1917)
     Florodora (1899); music also by Leslie Stuart
     A Country Girl (1902); music also by Lionel Monckton
     Three Little Maids (1903); music also by others
     The Cingalee (1904); music also by Lionel Monckton
     A Parisian Model (1906)
     The Dairymaids (1907); music also by Frank E. Tours and others
     The Balkan Princess (1910)
     Betty (1914); music also by others
     The Girl from Utah (1914); music also by Sidney Jones, Jerome Kern and others
     To-Night's the Night (1914)
     The Happy Day (1916); music also by Sidney Jones
     Naughty Cinderella (1925)
 Eli Rubinstein (1929–2003)
     Light, Lively and Yiddish (1970)
 Harry Ruby (1895–1974)
     Helen of Troy, New York (1923)
     No Other Girl (1924)
     The Ramblers (1926)
     Lucky (1927); additional music by Jerome Kern
     The Five O'Clock Girl (1927)
     Animal Crackers (1928)
     Top Speed (1929)
     High Kickers (1941)
 Gary Ruffin
     The Survival of St. Joan (1970); music also by Hank Ruffin
 Hank Ruffin
     The Survival of St. Joan (1970); music also by Gary Ruffin
 Joseph Rumshinsky (1881–1956)
     The Singing Rabbi (1931); music also by Harry Lubin
     Oy Is Dus a Leben (1942)
 Murray Rumshinsky
     The President's Daughter (1970)
 Todd Rundgren (born 1948)
     Up Against It (1989)
 Michael Rupert (born 1951)
     3 Guys Naked from the Waist Down (1985)
     Mail (1988)
 Adryan Russ
     Inside Out (1994)
 Anna Russell (1911–2006)
     Anna Russell's Little Show (1953)
 Brenda Russell (born 1949)
     The Color Purple (2005); music also by Allee Willis, Stephen Bray
 Willy Russell (born 1947)
     The Match Girls (1966)
     Blood Brothers (1983)
 Graham Russell (born 1950)
 All Out of Love (2018)
 Peter Rutherford
     The Hatpin (2008)

S 
 Norman Sachs
     My Old Friends (1979); music also by Mel Mandel
 Stormy Sacks
     Lamb Chop on Broadway (1994)
 Joshua Salzman
     I Love You Because (2006)
 Ralph Samantha
     Alladin de Musical (2002); music also by Jan Verheyen
 Arthur Samuels (1888–1938)
     Poppy (1923); music also by Stephen Jones
 Edmond Samuels
     The Highwayman (1950)
 Jerry Sanders
     Radical Radio (1995); music also by Karmo Sanders, Steve Underwood
 Karmo Sanders
     Radical Radio (1995); music also by Jerry Sanders, Steve Underwood
 Mark Sandrich, Jr. (1928–1995)
     Ben Franklin in Paris (1964); music also by Jerry Herman
 Tom Sankey
     The Golden Screw (1966)
 Irene Sankoff
     Come from Away (2013); music also by David Hein
 Jill Santoriello (born 1965)
     A Tale of Two Cities (1996)
 Leslie Sarony (1897–1985)
     Three Cheers (1928); music also by John Raymond Hubbell, Ray Henderson
     Love Lies (1929)
 Stan Satlin (born 1938)
     Children of Adam (1977)
 Mark Savage
     The Ballade of Little Mikey: The Birth of an Activist (1994)
 Tom Savage
     Musical Chairs (1980)
 Matt Sax
     Venice (2010)
 Ray Scantlin
     Joseph McCarthy Is Alive and Living in Dade County (1977)
 Milton Schafer (1920–2020)
     Bravo Giovanni (1962)
     Drat! The Cat! (1965)
 Steve Schalchlin (born 1953)
     The Last Session (1997)
     The Big Voice: God or Merman? (2002)
 Nitra Scharfman
     The Lieutenant (1975); music also by Gene Curty, Chuck Strand
 Ben Schatz
     Dragapella! (2001)
 Ton Scherpenzeel (born 1952)
     Kruimeltje (2000)
 Peter Schickele (born 1935) (member of The Open Window)
     Oh! Calcutta! (1969); music also by Robert Dennis, Stanley Walden
 Paul Schierhorn (1951–2012)
     The News (1985)
 John Schimmel
     Pump Boys and Dinettes (1981); music also by others
 Irving Schlein (1905–1986)
     Love Life (1948); ballet music only, music by Kurt Weill
 Adam Schlesinger (1967–2020)
     Cry-Baby (2007)
 Don Schlitz (born 1952)
     The Adventures of Tom Sawyer (2001)
 Harvey Schmidt (1929–2018)
     The Fantasticks (1960)
     110 in the Shade (1963)
     I Do! I Do! (1966)
     Celebration (1969)
     Colette (1970)
     Philemon (1975)
     Colette Collage (1983)
     Mirette (1996)
     The Show Goes On (1997)
     Roadside (2001)
 Joshua Schmidt
     Adding Machine (2007)
     A Minister's Wife (2009)
     Midwestern Gothic (2017)
 Moritz Schneider (born 1976)
     Dällebach Kari (2010)
     Der Besuch der alten Dame (2014)
 Gary Schocker (born 1959)
     The Awakening (1999)
     Far from the Madding Crowd (2000)
 Mark Schoenfeld
     Brooklyn (2004); music also by Barri McPherson
 Claude-Michel Schönberg (born 1944)
     La Révolution Française (1973); music also by Raymond Jeannot
     Les Misérables (1980)
     Miss Saigon (1989)
     Martin Guerre (1995)
     The Pirate Queen (2006)
 Eric Schorr
     Young Tom Edison (1997)
 Barbara Schottenfeld
     I Can't Keep Running in Place (1981)
     Catch Me if I Fall (1990)
 John Schroeder (1935–2017)
     Pull Both Ends (1972); music also by Anthony King
 Franz Schubert (1797–1828)
     Blossom Time (1921); music adapted by Sigmund Romberg
 Norbert Schultze (1911–2002)
     Käpt'n Bay-Bay (1959); also a 1953 film
 Mort Schuman (1936–1991)
     Budgie (1988)
 Walter Schumann (1913–1958)
     3 for Tonight (1955)
 Arthur Schwartz (1900–1984)
     The Grand Street Follies of 1926 (1926)
     The New Yorkers (1927); music also by Edgar Fairchild, Charles Schwab
     The Little Show (1929); music also by others
     The Grand Street Follies of 1929 (1929); music also by Max Ewing, Max and Nathaniel Lief
     Here Comes the Bride (1930)
     The Co-Optimists (1930); music also by others
     The Second Little Show (1930); music also by others
     Princess Charming (1930); music also by Albert Sirmay
     Three's a Crowd (1930); music also by others
     The Band Wagon (1931)
     Flying Colors (1932)
     Nice Goings On (1933)
     Revenge with Music (1934)
     At Home Abroad (1935)
     Follow the Sun (1936)
     Virginia (1937)
     Between the Devil (1937)
     Stars in Your Eyes (1939)
     Park Avenue (1946)
     Inside U.S.A. (1948)
     A Tree Grows in Brooklyn (1951)
     By the Beautiful Sea (1954)
     The Gay Life (1961)
     Jennie (1963)
     That's Entertainment (1972)
 Jean Schwartz (1878–1956)
     Vera Violetta (1911); music also by Edmund Eysler, George M. Cohan, Louis A. Hirsch
     The Passing Show of 1913 (1913); music also by Al W. Brown
     The Passing Show of 1918 (1918); music also by Sigmund Romberg
     Monte Cristo Jr. (1919); music also by Sigmund Romberg
     The Passing Show of 1921 (1921)
     The Passing Show of 1923 (1923); music also by Sigmund Romberg
     Innocent Eyes (1924); music also by Sigmund Romberg
     The Passing Show of 1924 (1924); music also by Sigmund Romberg
     Sunny Days (1928)
 Stephen Schwartz (born 1948)
     Godspell (1971)
     Pippin (1972)
     The Magic Show (1974)
     The Baker's Wife (1976)
     Working (1978); music also by Mary Rodgers, James Taylor, Craig Carnelia, Micki Grant
     Children of Eden (1991)
     Wicked (2003)
     Captain Louie (2005)
 Milton Schwartzwald (1891–1950)
     Flora Bella (1916); music also by Charles Cuvillier
     Be Yourself! (1924); music also by  Lewis E. Gensler
 Ernest G. Schweikert
     Rumple (1957)
 Matthew Scott
     Mother Clap's Molly House (2001)
 Raymond Scott (1908–1944)
     Lute Song (1946)
 Don Sebesky (born 1937)
     Prince of Central Park (1989)
 Sholom Secunda (1894–1974)
     Bagels and Yox (1951); music also by Hy Jacobson
     Bei Mir Bist Du Schoen (1961)
 Albert Selden
     Small Wonder (1948); music also by Baldwin Bergersen
 Harold Seletsky
     Hot Klezmer (1998); music also by Mary Feinsinger
 Matty Selman
     Young Rube (1989)
 Dov Seltzer (born 1932)
     The Megilla of Itzik Manger (1968)
     To Live Another Summer, to Pass Another Winter (1971)
 Will Severin
     A Tale of Cinderella (1994); music also by George David Weiss
 The Shadows
     Babes in the Wood (1965)
 Michael Shaieb
     Go-Go Beach (2006); music also by Brent Lord
     Through a Glass, Darkly (2008)
 Marc Shaiman (born 1959)
     Hairspray (2002)
     Martin Short: Fame Becomes Me (2006)
     Catch Me If You Can (2009)
     Charlie and the Chocolate Factory (2013)
 Joe Shane
     White Noise: A Cautionary Musical (2011); music also by Robert Morris, Steven Morris
 Julie Shannon
     The Christmas Schooner (1996)
 Dan Shapiro
     Artists and Models of 1943 (1943); music also by  Philip Charig, Milton Pascal
     Follow the Girls (1944); music also by Milton Pascal, Philip Charig
 Allen Shawn (born 1948)
     Luck, Pluck, and Virtue (1995)
 Nancy Shayne
     Marcy in the Galaxy (2008)
 Toni Shearer
     Mother Earth (1972)
 Jonathan Sheffer
     Hundreds of Hats (1995); music also by Marvin Hamlisch, Alan Menken
 Buddy Sheffield
     Cleavage (1982)
 Duncan Sheik (born 1969)
     Spring Awakening (2006)
     American Psycho (2013)
 James Shelton
     Dance Me a Song (1950)
     Mrs. Patterson (1954)
     Almost Crazy (1955); music also by Portia Nelson, Raymond Taylor
 Tom Shelton (born 1955)
     Caddie Woodlawn (2011)
 Ted Shen (born 1945)
     A Second Chance (2011)
 Andrew Sherman
     Debbie Does Dallas: The Musical (2002)
 Garry Sherman (b. 1933)
     Comin' Uptown (1979)
     Amen Corner (1983)
 Kim D. Sherman
     O Pioneers! (2001)
 Richard M. Sherman (born 1928)
     Victory Canteen (1971); music also by Robert B. Sherman
     Over Here! (1974); music also by Robert B. Sherman
     Dawgs! (1983); music also by Robert B. Sherman
     Charlie Sent Me! (1984)
     Busker Alley (1994); music also by Robert B. Sherman
     Chitty Chitty Bang Bang (2002); music also by Robert B. Sherman
     Mary Poppins (2005); music also by Robert B. Sherman and George Stiles
 Robert B. Sherman (1925–2012)
     Victory Canteen (1971); music also by Richard M. Sherman
     Over Here! (1974); music also by Richard M. Sherman
     Dawgs! (1983); music also by Richard M. Sherman
     Busker Alley (1994); music also by Richard M. Sherman
     Chitty Chitty Bang Bang (2002); music also by Richard M. Sherman
     Mary Poppins (2005); music also by Richard M. Sherman and George Stiles
 Robert J. Sherman (born 1968)
     Love Birds (2015)
     Bumblescratch (2016)
     A Spoonful of Sherman (2014, 2018)
 Ned Sherrin (1931–2007)
     Cindy-Ella or I Gotta Shoe (1962); music also by Caryl Brahms
 Manning Sherwin (1902–1974)
     Under the Counter (1947)
     Her Excellency (1949); music also by George Posford
 Harvey Shield (born 1946)
     Hamelin: A Musical Tale from Rags to Riches (1985); music also by Richard Jarboe
 David Shire (born 1937)
     Cyrano (1958)
     The Grand Tour (1959)
     Starting Here, Starting Now (1977)
     Baby (1983)
     Urban Blight (1988)
     Closer Than Ever (1989)
     big: the musical (1996)
     Take Flight (2007)
 Max Showalter (1917–2000)
     My Square Laddie (1957)
     Harrigan 'n Hart (1985); music also by Edward Harrigan, David Braham
     Touch of the Child
 Michael Shubert
     Shabbatai (1995); music also by Michael Edwin
 Pierce Siebers
     A Very Potter Senior Year (2012); music also by Clark Baxtresser, A.J. Holmes, Darren Criss
 Arthur Siegel (1923–1994)
     Mask and Gown (1957); music also by Dorothea Freitag, Ronny Graham
     Corkscrews! (1982)
     Tallulah (1983)
 Carl Sigman (1909–2000)
     Angel in the Wings (1947)
 Doug Silver
     Sidd (2006)
 Fred Silver
     In Gay Company (1974)
     Sterling Silver (1979)
 Jeffrey Silverman
     Broadway Scandals of 1928 (1982)
     Options (1985)
 Stanley Silverman (born 1938)
     Dr. Selavy's Magic Theatre or Swinging at the Stock Exchange (1972)
     Up from Paradise (1973)
 Martin Silvestri
     The Fields of Ambrosia (1996)
     Johnny Guitar (2004); music also by Joel Higgins
 Lucy Simon (1940–2022)
     The Secret Garden (1991)
     Zhivago (2006)
     Doctor Zhivago (2011)
 Paul Simon (born 1941)
     The Capeman (1998)
 Nana Simonpoulos
     American Dreams: Lost and Found (2003)
 Ted Simons
     Potholes (1979)
 Allen Simpson
     Fellowship! (2005)
 Bland Simpson
     Hot Grog (1977); music also by Jim Wann
 Gerald Singer
     Frère Jacques (1968)
 Peter Sipos
     Jeanne la pucelle (1997)
 Noble Sissle (1889–1975)
     Shuffle Along, or, the Making of the Musical Sensation of 1921 and All That Followed (2016); music also by Eubie Blake
 Peter Skellern (1947–2017)
     Who Plays Wins (1985); music also by Richard Stilgoe
 Matthew Sklar (born 1973)
     The Rhythm Club
     Wicked City
     The Wedding Singer (2006)
     Elf (2010)
 Julian Slade (1930–2006)
     Salad Days (1954)
     Free as Air (1957)
     Follow That Girl (1960)
     Hooray for Daisy! (1960)
     Wildest Dreams (1961)
     Vanity Fair (1962)
     Trelawney (1972)
 Walter Slaughter (1860–1908)
     Alice in Wonderland (1886)
 A. Baldwin Sloane (1872–1925)
     The Wizard of Oz (1902); music also by Paul Tietjens and others
     The Greenwich Village Follies of 1919 (1919); music also by others
 Charlie Smalls (1944–1987)
     The Wiz (1975)
 Christopher Smith
     Amazing Grace (2012)
 Walt Smith
     Ari (1971)
 Tom Snow (born 1947)
     Heartbeats (1989); music also by Amanda McBroom, Gerald Sternbach, Michele Brourman
     Footloose (1998)
 Ted Sod (born 1951)
     27 Rue de Fleurus (2008)
 Bill Solly
     Boy Meets Boy (1975)
     The Great American Backstage Musical: an Intimate Epic (1976)
 Stephen Sondheim (1930–2021)
     Saturday Night (1954)
     A Funny Thing Happened on the Way to the Forum (1962); also a 1966 film
     Hot Spot (1963); music also by Mary Rodgers
     Anyone Can Whistle (1964)
     Evening Primrose (1967)
     Company (1970)
     Follies (1971)
     A Little Night Music (1973); also a 1977 film
     Sondheim Evening: A Musical Tribute (1973); additional music by Leonard Bernstein, Richard Rodgers, Jule Styne
     The Frogs (1974)
     Pacific Overtures (1976)
     Side by Side by Sondheim (1976); additional music by Leonard Bernstein, Mary Rodgers, Richard Rodgers, Jule Styne
     Sweeney Todd, the Demon Barber of Fleet Street (1979); also a 2007 film
     Marry Me a Little (1980)
     Merrily We Roll Along (1981)
     A Stephen Sondheim Evening (1983)
     You're Gonna Love Tomorrow (1983)
     Sunday in the Park with George (1984)
     Into the Woods (1987); also a 2014 film
     Assassins (1990)
     Sondheim: A Celebration at Carnegie Hall (1992)
     Putting It Together (1992)
     Passion (1994)
     Sondheim Tonight (1998)
     Moving On: A 70th Birthday Celebration (2000)
     Bounce (2003)
     Road Show (2008); revision of Bounce
     Sondheim on Sondheim (2010)
 Kim Sorensen
     Egtved Pigen
 Ondřej Soukup (born 1951)
     Johanka z Arku (2000)
     Elixír života (2005)
 John Philip Sousa (1854–1932)
     Désirée (1884)
     Teddy & Alice (1987); music also by Richard Kapp
 Henry Souvaine
     Merry-Go-Round (1927); music also by Jay Gorney
 Saul Spangenberg
     The English Only Restaurant (1990); music also by Sergio García Marruz
 Mira J. Spektor (1928–2021)
     The Housewives' Cantata (1980)
 David Spencer
     Phantom of the Opera (1997)
 Fred Spielman
     A Lady Says Yes (1945); music also by Arthur Gershwin
 Jason Sprague
     Always (1997); music also by William May
 Philip Springer (b. 1926)
     The Chosen (1988)
     A Song Floating (1994)
 Fred Stamer
     Buttrio Square (1952); music also by Arthur Jones
 Dave Stamper (1883–1963)
     Ziegfeld Follies of 1916 (1916); music also by Jerome Kern, Louis Hirsch
     Ziegfeld Follies of 1922 (1922); music also by Louis Hirsch
 Peter Stannard
     Lola Montez (1958)
 Keith Statham
     Share My Lettuce (1957); music also by Patrick Gowers
 Miloš Štědroň (born 1942)
     Nana (2005)
 Jim Steinman (1947–2021)
     More Than You Deserve (1973)
     Tanz der Vampire (1997); 2002 Broadway title: Dance of the Vampires
 Geoff Stephens (1934–2020)
     Dear Anyone (1983)
     Off the Wall: A Revuesical (1991)
 Ty Stephens
     Shades of Harlem (1983); music also by Frank Owens, Jeree Wade, Branice McKenzie
 Walt Stepp
     Mark Twain's Blues (2008)
 Sam H. Stept (1897–1964)
     Shady Lady (1933); music also by Jesse Greer
     Yokel Boy (1939); music also by Lew Brown, Charles Tobias
 Harold Stern
     Artists and Models of 1930 (1930); music also by Ernie Golden
 Gerald Sternbach
     Heartbeats (1989); music also by Amanda McBroom, Michele Brourman, Tom Snow
 Ann Sternberg
     Gertrude Stein's First Reader (1969)
 Steve Sterner
     Lovers (1975)
 Monty Stevens
     Jane Eyre (1961)
 Stew (born 1961)
     Passing Strange (2008); music also by Heidi Rodewald
 Dave Stewart (born 1952)
     Barbarella (2004)
     Ghost (2011); music also by Glen Ballard
 Robb Stewart
     Chrysanthemum (1956)
 Rod Stewart (born 1945)
     Tonight's the Night (2003)
 Dan Sticco
     A Change in the Heir (1990)
 George Stiles (born 1961)
     Just So (1985)
     Moll Flanders (1993)
     Peter Pan: A Musical Adventure (1996)
     Honk! The Ugly Duckling (1997)
     The 3 Musketeers (2001)
     Tom Jones (2004)
     Mary Poppins (2005); music also by Richard M. Sherman and Robert B. Sherman
     Betty Blue Eyes (2011)
     Soho Cinders (2011)
     Travels With My Aunt (2016)
     Half a Sixpence (2016); music also by David Heneker
     The Wind in the Willows (2016)
 Richard Stilgoe (born 1943)
     Who Plays Wins (1985); music also by Peter Skellern
     Body Work (1987)
     Brilliant the Dinosaur (1992)
 Nick Stimson
     NHS – The Musical (2006); music also by Jimmy Jewell
 Sting (born 1951)
     The Last Ship (2014)
 Louis St. Louis
     Truckload (1975)
 Jeffrey Stock
     Triumph of Love (1997)
 Michael Stockler
     Quilt
 Joop Stokkermans (1937–2012)
     De Engel van Amsterdam (1975)
     Nijntje (2001)
     Kunt u mij de weg naar Hamelen vertellen, mijnheer? (2003)
 Janusz Stoklosa
     Metro (1991)
 Mike Stoller (born 1933)
     Smokey Joe's Cafe (1995); music also by Jerry Leiber
     The People in the Picture (2011); music also by Artie Butler
 Robert Stolz (1880–1975)
     Night of Love (1941)
     Mr. Strauss Goes to Boston (1945)
 Harry Stone
     Chase a Rainbow (1980)
 Matt Stone (born 1971)
     The Book of Mormon (2011); music also by Trey Parker and Robert Lopez
 Herbert Stothart (1885–1949)
     Always You (1920)
     Tickle Me (1920)
     Jimmie (1920)
     Daffy Dill (1922)
     Wildflower (1923); music also by Vincent Youmans
     Mary Jane McKane (1923); music also by Vincent Youmans
     Vogues of 1924 (1924)
     Marjorie (1924); music also by Sigmund Romberg, Philip Culkin, Stephen Jones
     Rose-Marie (1924); music also by Rudolf Friml
     Song of the Flame (1925); music also by George Gershwin; also a 1930 film
     Golden Dawn (1927); music also by Emmerich Kálmán
     Good Boy (1928)
     Polly (1929); music also by Philip Charig
 Adrian Stout
     Shockheaded Peter (1998); music also by Martyn Jacques, Adrian Huge
 Matthew Strachan (born 1970)
     Next Door's Baby (2008)
 Jack Strachley
     Spread It Abroad (1936)
 Willard Straight
     The Athenian Touch (1964)
 Chuck Strand
     The Lieutenant (1975); music also by Gene Curty, Nitra Scharfman
 Oscar Straus (1870–1954)
     The Chocolate Soldier (1909)
     My Lady's Glove (1917); music also by Sigmund Romberg
 Johann Strauss II (1825–1899)
     The Great Waltz (1930); music adapted by Robert Wright, George Forrest
     Paradise Found (2010)
 Charles Strouse (born 1928)
     Bye Bye Birdie (1960)
     All American (1962)
     Golden Boy (1964)
     It's a Bird...It's a Plane...It's Superman (1966)
     Applause (1970)
     Six (1971)
     I and Albert (1972)
     Annie (1977)
     A Broadway Musical (1978)
     Charlie and Algernon (1979); London title: Flowers for Algernon
     Bring Back Birdie (1981)
     Nightingale (1982)
     Dance a Little Closer (1983)
     Mayor (1985)
     Rags (1986)
     Annie 2: Miss Hannigan's Revenge (1989)
     Nick & Nora (1991)
     Annie Warbucks (1993)
     Real Men (2005)
     Studio (2006)
     Minsky's (2009)
 Leslie Stuart (1863–1928)
     Florodora (1899); music also by Paul Rubens
     The Silver Slipper (1901)
     The School Girl (1903)
     The Belle of Mayfair (1906)
     Havana (1908)
     Captain Kidd (1910)
     The Slim Princess (1911)
     Peggy (1911)
 Dan Studney
     Reefer Madness! (1998)
 Grant Sturiale
     Olympus on My Mind (1986)
 Jule Styne (1905–1994)
     High Button Shoes (1947)
     Gentlemen Prefer Blonds (1949); also a 1953 film
     Two on the Aisle (1951)
     Hazel Flagg (1953)
     Peter Pan (1954); music mostly by Mark Charlap
     Bells Are Ringing (1956)
     Ruggles of Red Gap (1957); television musical
     A Party with Betty Comden and Adolph Green (1958); music also by Leonard Bernstein, André Previn, Saul Chaplin, Roger Edens
     Say, Darling (1958)
     Gypsy (1959); also a 1962 film
     Do Re Mi (1960)
     Subways Are For Sleeping (1961)
     Mister Magoo's Christmas Carol (1962); television musical
     Funny Girl (1964); also a 1968 film
     Wonderworld (1964)
     Fade Out - Fade In (1964)
     The Dangerous Christmas of Red Riding Hood (1965); television musical
     Hallelujah, Baby! (1967)
     Darling of the Day (1968)
     Look to the Lilies (1970)
     Prettybelle (1971)
     Sugar (1972)
     Lorelei (1974)
     Bar Mitzvah Boy (1978)
     One Night Stand (1980)
     Pieces of Eight (1985)
     Some Like It Hot (1992)
     The Red Shoes (1993)
 Marshall Such
     Radio! the Musical (2002); music also by Stephen Taylor
 Dana Suesse (1909–1987)
     Crazy with the Heat (1941); music also by Irvin Graham, Rudi Revil
 Arthur Sullivan (1842–1900)
     The Hot Mikado (1939)
     Hollywood Pinafore (1945)
     The Black Mikado (1975)
     Hot Mikado (1995); music adapted by Rob Bowman
     Pinafore! (2001)
 Henry Sullivan
     Murray Anderson's Almanac (1929); music also by Milton Ager
     Thumbs Up! (1934); music also by James F. Hanley
 Sam Sutherland
     Giant Killer Shark: The Musical (2006); music also by Graham Losee, Aaron Zorgel
 Eric Svejcar
     Caligula (2004)
 Karel Svoboda (1938–2007)
     Dracula (1995)
     Monte Cristo (2000)
     Golem (2006)
 Milan Svoboda (born 1951)
     Pěna dní (1994)
 Elizabeth Swados (1951–2016)
     Nightclub Cantata (1977)
     Runaways (1978)
     Dispatches (1979)
     Alice in Concert (1980)
     The Haggadah, a Passover Cantata (1980)
     Lullabye and Goodnight (1982)
     Doonesbury (1983)
     Rap Master Ronnie (1984)
     The Red Sneaks (1989)
     Jonah (1990)
     Groundhog (1992)
 Donald Swann (1923–1994)
     At the Drop of a Hat (1956)
     At the Drop of Another Hat (1963)
 Phillip Swann (born 1960)
     Play It Cool (2011); music also by others
 Kay Swift (1897–1994)
     Fine and Dandy (1930)

T 
 Howard Talbot (1865–1928)
     Wapping Old Stairs (1894)
     Monte Carlo (1896)
     A Chinese Honeymoon (1899)
     Miss Wingrove (1905)
     The White Chrysanthemum (1905)
     The Girl Behind the Counter (1906)
     The Three Kisses (1907)
     The Belle of Brittany (1908)
     The Arcadians (1909); music also by Lionel Monckton
     The Mousmé (1911)
     The Pearl Girl (1913)
     A Milled Grill (1914)
     My Lady Frayle (1916)
     Mr. Manhattan (1916)
     The Light Blues (1916)
     The Boy (1917); music also by Lionel Monckton
     Who's Hooper? (1919)
     My Nieces (1921)
 Shoichi Tama
     Bleach (2005)
 Albert M. Tapper
     Imperfect Chemistry (2000)
     Sessions (2009)
 Douglas Tappin
     I Dream (2010)
 Paul Taranto
     Evangeline (1998)
 Alan C. Taylor, MD
     Emergency Room (1994)
 Bernard J. Taylor (born 1944)
     Neighbors and Lovers (1987)
     Wuthering Heights (1991)
     Success! (1993)
     Pride and Prejudice (1994)
     Nosferatu the Vampire (1994)
     Much Ado (1996)
     Liberty! The Siege of the Alamo (2000)
 James Taylor (born 1948)
     Working (1978); music also by Stephen Schwartz, Mary Rodgers, Craig Carnelia, Micki Grant
 Jeremy Taylor (born 1937)
     Wait a Minim! (1962)
 John Taylor
     Charlie Girl (1965); music also by David Heneker
     The Biograph Girl (1980); music also by David Heneker
 Raymond Taylor
     Almost Crazy (1955); music also by James Shelton, Portia Nelson
 Stephen Taylor
     Radio! The Musical (2002); music also by Marshall Such
 Pyotr Ilyich Tchaikovsky (1840–1893)
     Music in My Heart (1947)
 Diane Tell (born 1958)
     Marilyn Montreuil (1991)
 Bob Telson (born 1949)
     The Gospel at Colonus (1983)
     Chronicle of a Death Foretold (1995)
 Neil Tennant (born 1954) (member of Pet Shop Boys)
     Closer to Heaven (2001); music also by Chris Lowe
 Jeanine Tesori (born 1961)
     Violet (1997)
     Thoroughly Modern Millie (2000); music also by others
     Caroline, or Change (2003)
     Shrek (2008)
     Fun Home (2013)
 Adolph Thenstead
     Caribbean Carnival (1947); music also by Samuel L. Manning
 Cathy Thomas
     I Don<3 U Ne Mor (2010); music also by Frank Grullon
 Edward Thomas (born 1924)
     Mata Hari (1967)
     Ballad for a Firing Squad (1968)
     Six Wives (1992)
 Hugh Thomas
     Hard Times (2000); music also by Christopher Tookey
 Keith Thomas
     Alice through the Looking Glass (1994)
 Richard Thomas (born 1964)
     Jerry Springer: The Opera (2003); music also by Stewart Lee
 Keith Thompson
     Kooky Tunes (1998)
 Eric Thoroman
     Love Lemmings (1991)
 Þorvaldur Þorvaldsson
     Ávaxtakafan (1998)
 Penelope Thwaites (born 1944)
     Ride! Ride! (1976)
 Harry Tierney (1890–1965)
     Keep Smiling (1913)
     Irene (1919); music also by others, 1973 revival with music also by Charles Gaynor
     The Broadway Whirl (1921)
     Up she Goes (1922)
     Glory (1922)
     Kid Boots (1923)
     Rio Rita (1927)
     Cross My Heart (1928)
 Thomas Tierney (born 1942)
     Eleanor – an American Love Story (1987)
 Paul Tietjens (1877–1943)
     The Wizard of Oz (1902); music also by A. Baldwin Sloane and others
 Herman Timberg (1892–1952)
     The Show of Wonders (1916); music also by Sigmund Romberg, Otto Motzan
     Doing Our Bit (1917); music also by Sigmund Romberg
     Tick-tack-toe (1920)
 Charles Tobias (1898–1970)
     Hellzapoppin' (1938); music also by Sammy Fain
     Yokel Boy (1939); music also by Lew Brown, Sam H. Stept
 Shunichi Tokura (born 1948)
     Out of the Blue (1994)
 Christopher Tookey (born 1950)
     Hard Times (2000); music also by Hugh Thomas
 Frank E. Tours (1877–1963)
     The Dairymaids (1907); music also by Paul Rubens and others
     La Belle Paree (1911); music also by Jerome Kern
     Nuts and Wine (1914); music also by Melville Gideon
 Allen Toussaint (1938–2015)
     Staggerlee (1987)
 Pete Townshend (born 1945)
     The Who's Tommy (1979)
     The Boy Who Heard Music (2007); music also by Rachel Fuller
 Peter Tranchell (1922–1993)
     Zuleika (1954)
 Stephen Trask (born 1967)
     Hedwig and the Angry Inch (1998); also a 2001 film
 Armando Trovaioli (1917–2013)
     Rugantino (1962)
     Ciao, Rudy (1966)
     Aggiungi un posto a tavola (1974)
     Accendiamo la lampada (1979)
     Bravo! (1981)
 Tony Troy
     The Flute Player's Song (1999)
 Joseph Tunbridge (1886–1961)
     For the Love of Mike (1931); music also by Jack Waller

U 
 Georges Ulmer (1919–1989)
     Folies Bergère of 1964 (1964); music also by Henri Betti
 Björn Ulvaeus (born 1945)
     Abbacadabra (1983); music also by Benny Andersson
     Chess (1984); music also by Benny Andersson
     Kristina från Duvemåla (1995); music also by Benny Andersson
     Mamma Mia! (1999); music also by Benny Andersson; also a 2008 film
 Franklin Underwood
     Lovely Ladies, Kind Gentlemen (1970); music also by Stan Freeman
 Steve Underwood
     Radical Radio (1995); music also by Jerry Sanders, Karmo Sanders
 Boris Urbánek (born 1961)
     Mrazík: Pohádkový Muzikál na Ledě (1998); music also by Nikolai Budaškin
 Jacques Urbont
     All in Love (1961)
     Rumpelstiltskin (1965)

V 
 James Valcq (born 1963)
     Zombies from The Beyond (1995)
     The Spitfire Grill (2001)
 Carlos Valdes
     Me and My Dick (2009); music also by A.J. Holmes, Darren Criss
 Michael Valenti (born 1942)
     Snow White and the Seven Dwarfs (1965)
     Blood Red Roses (1970)
     Beauty and the Beast (1972)
     Lovesong (1976)
     Honky Tonk Nights (1980)
     Oh, Brother! (1981)
     In Search of a Musical (1993)
 Frederico Valério (1913–1982)
     Hit the Trail (1954)
 François Valéry (born 1954)
     L'ombre d'un géant (2001)
 Darren Vallier
     A Ring of Roses (1996)
 Johan van den Ende
     Sneeuwwitje (1998)
 Ad van Dijk (born 1959)
     Tam Tam (1982)
     Verdraaid (1990)
     Cyrano de Musical (1992)
     Joe de Musical (1997)
     Rex (2001)
     De Vliegende Hollander (2004)
 Jimmy Van Heusen (1913–1990)
     Swingin' the Dream (1939)
     Nellie Bly (1946)
     Carnival in Flanders (1953)
     Les Poupées de Paris (1964)
     Skyscraper (1965)
     Walking Happy (1966)
     Thoroughly Modern Millie (1967 film); music also by Elmer Bernstein and others; title song used in the 2002 Broadway musical
 Melvin Van Peebles (1932–2021)
     Ain't Supposed to Die a Natural Death (1971)
     Don't Play Us Cheap (1972)
 Värttinä
     The Lord of the Rings (2006); music also by A. R. Rahman
 Georgii Vasilyev (born 1957)
     Nord-Ost (2001); music also by Aleksei Ivaschenko
 Giuseppe Verdi (1813–1901)
     My Darlin' Aida (1952)
 Jan Verheyen
     Alladin de Musical (2002); music also by Ralph Samantha
 S. Vetkin
     Strider: The Story of a Horse (1979); music also by Mark Razovsky, Norman L. Berman
 Valerie Vigoda
     Striking 12 (2006); music also by Gene Lewin, Brendan Milburn
 Heitor Villa-Lobos (1887–1959)
     Magdalena (1948); music adapted by Robert Wright, George Forrest
 Albert T. Viola
     Head over Heels (1981)
 Hans Vollarth
     Holmes! (2000)
 Rob Volpintesta
     America the Beautiful (1994)
 David Vos
     Something's Afoot (1976); music also by James McDonald, Robert Gerlach

W 
 Jeree Wade
     Shades of Harlem (1983); music also by Frank Owens, Ty Stephens, Branice McKenzie
 Lee Wainer (1904–1979)
     Sing for Your Supper (1939); music also by Ned Lehac
     New Faces of 1943 (1942)
 Tom Waits (born 1949)
     The Black Rider (1990)
     Alice (1992)
 Stanley Walden (born 1932); member of The Open Window
     Oh! Calcutta! (1969); music also by Peter Schickele, Robert Dennis
 Robert Waldman (born 1936)
     Here's Where I Belong (1968)
     The Robber Bridegroom (1975)
 Don Walker (1907–1989)
     Allah Be Praised! (1944); music also by Baldwin Bergersen
     Memphis Bound! (1945); music also by Clay Warnick
     Courtin' Time (1951); music also by Jack Lawrence
 Michael Patrick Walker (born 1971)
     Altar Boyz (2005); music also by Gary Adler
 Steven Luke Walker
     Blaze (2007)
 John Trent Wallace (born 1966)
     The Hunchback of Notre Dame (1996)
 Jack Waller (1885–1957)
     For the Love of Mike (1931); music also by Joseph Tunbridge
 Fats Waller (1904–1943)
     Early to Bed (1943)
     Ain't Misbehavin' (1978)
 Ruth Wallis (1920–2007)
     Boobs! The Musical: The World According to Ruth Wallis (2003)
 Kevin Walsh
     Clarinda (2008)
 Nathan Wang (born 1956)
     Imelda (2009)
 Jim Wann (born 1948)
     Hot Grog (1977); music also by Bland Simpson
     Pump Boys and Dinettes (1981); music also by others
     King Mackerel (1996)
 Stephen Warbeck (born 1953)
     The Villains' Opera (2000); after John Gay's The Beggar's Opera
     The Grave White Way (2001)
     Judy's Scary Little Christmas (2002)
 Matthew Ward
     After the Fair (1999)
 Michael Ward
     Personals (1980)
     Genesis: Music and Miracles (1988)
 Trisha Ward (born 1972)
     Street of Dreams (2012)
 Gerry Ware
     Ripper The Musical (2007); music also by Matthew Pritchard
 Russell Warner
     People in Show Business Make Long Goodbyes (1979)
 Clay Warnick (1915–1995)
     Dream with Music (1944)
     Memphis Bound! (1945); music also by Don Walker
     The Adventures of Marco Polo (1956); original television play
Harry Warren (1893–1981)
     Paris (1928); music also by Cole Porter, Walter Kollo, Louis Alter, Fred E. Ahlert
     Crazy Quilt (1931)
     The Laugh Parade (1931)
     Shangri-La (1956)
     42nd Street (1980)
 Kerry Michael Warren
     Dracul (1995)
 Rod Warren
     Below the Belt (1966)
 Scott Warrender
     Das Barbecü (1991)
 Daryl Waters
     Bring in 'Da Noise, Bring in 'Da Funk (1995); music also by Ann Duquesnay, Zane Mark
     Harlem Song (2002); music also by Zane Mark
 Jeff Wayne (born 1943)
     Two Cities (1969)
     The War of the Worlds (1975)
     Spatacus (1992)
 Bill Weeden (born 1940)
     Hurry, Harry (1972)
 Kurt Weill (1900–1950)
     The Threepenny Opera (1928)
     Happy End (1929)
     A Kingdom for a Cow (Der Kuhhandel) (1935)
     Johnny Johnson (1936)
     Knickerbocker Holiday (1938)
     Lady in the Dark (1941)
     One Touch of Venus (1943)
     The Firebrand of Florence (1945)
     Street Scene (1946)
     Love Life (1948); ballet music by Irving Schlein
     Lost in the Stars (1949)
     A Kurt Weill Cabaret (1963)
     Berlin to Broadway with Kurt Weill (1972)
     Nashville, New York (1979); music also by Vernon Duke
     Three Weill Men (2001)
     LoveMusik (2007)
 Tom Wilson Weinberg (born 1945)
     Ten Percent Revue (1985)
     Get Used to It! (1992)
     Sixty Years With Bruhs and Gean (1995)
     Eleanor & Hick (1997)
     The Teachings of Chairman Rick (2005)
     Sunrise at Hyde Park (2013)
 Michael Weiner (b. 1975)
     First Date (2012); music also by Alan Zachary
     Secondhand Lions (2013); music also by Alan Zachary 
 Stephen Weiner
     Newyorkers (2001)
     Iron Curtain (2006)
 George David Weiss (1921–2010)
     Mr. Wonderful (1956); music also by Jerry Bock, Larry Holofcener
     First Impressions (1959); music also by Robert Goldman, Glenn Paxton
     Maggie Flynn (1968); music also by Luigi Creatore, Hugo Peretti
     A Tale of Cinderella (1994); music also by Will Severin
 David Welch
     Salon: an Intoxicating New Musical (1998)
     Studio (1998)
 Percy Wenrich (1880–1952)
     The Crinoline Girl (1914)
     The Right Girl (1921)
     Castles in the Air (1926)
     Who Cares? (1930)
 Glenn Wescott
     The Golden Knight (1962)
 Martin Wesley-Smith (1945–2019)
     Boojum! (1986)
 Dennis West
     Dracula: A Rock Opera (1997); music also by John R. Briggs
 Mike Westbrook (born 1936)
     Tyger (1971)
 Harris Wheeler
     Blue Plate Special (1983)
 Bill Whelan (born 1950)
     Riverdance (1995)
 Ian Whitcomb (1941–2020)
     Lotus Land (1992)
 Dan White
     Ziegfeld Follies of 1943 (1943); music also by Ray Henderson
 George White (1892–1968)
     George White's Scandals of 1929 (1929); music also by Cliff Friend, Ray Henderson
 Maurice White (1941–2016), member of Earth, Wind and Fire
     Hot Feet (2006)
 Nancy White
     Anne & Gilbert (2005); music also by Jeff Hochhauser, Bob Johnston
 Richard A. Whiting (1891–1938)
     Free for All (1931)
     Take a Chance (1932); music also by Nacio Herb Brown, Vincent Youmans
 Michael Wild (born 1931)
     Pardon My Prejudice (1957)
     Earnestly Yours (1960)
     Maggie (1977)
     The Six Wives of Henry VIII (1988)
     Masquerade
     Josephine
 Alec Wilder (1907–1980)
     Kittiwake Island (1960)
     Clues to a Life (1982); music also by Morty Palitz
 Frank Wildhorn (born 1958)
     Jekyll & Hyde (1990)
     Svengali (1991)
     Victor/Victoria (1995); music also by Henry Mancini
     The Scarlet Pimpernel (1997)
     The Civil War (1998)
     Camille Claudel (2003)
     Dracula (2004)
     Waiting for the Moon (2005)
     Rudolf (2006)
     Never Say Goodbye (2006)
     Carmen (2008)
     Bonnie & Clyde (2009)
     The Count of Monte Cristo (2009)
     Cyrano de Bergerac (2009)
     Wonderland (2009)
     Tears of Heaven (2010)
     Mitsuko (2011)
     Excalibur (2014)
     Death Note (2015)
     Mata Hari (2016)
     The Passage to the Light - The Revolutionary Maximilien Robespierre (2017)
     The Man Who Laughs (2018)
 Andrew Wilkie
     Tap Dogs (1995)
 Dudley Wilkinson (1897–1991)
     Queen o' Hearts (1922); music also by Lewis E. Gensler
 Jill Williams
     Rainbow Jones (1974)
 John Williams (born 1932)
     Thomas and the King (1975)
 Paul Williams (born 1940)
     Phantom of the Paradise (1974); also a 1974 film
     The Muppets Christmas Carol (1992)
     Bugsy Malone (1997)
     Happy Days (2006)
 Timothy Williams (born 1966)
     Napoleon (1994)
 Allee Willis (1947–2019)
     The Color Purple (2005); music also by Brenda Russell, Stephen Bray
 Phil Willmott (born 1968)
     Once Upon a Time at the Adelphi (2008)
 Meredith Willson (1902–1984)
     The Music Man (1957); also a 1962 film
     The Unsinkable Molly Brown (1960); also a 1964 film
     Here's Love (1963)
     1491 (1969)
 Brian Wilson (born 1942)
     Good Vibrations (2005); music also by The Beach Boys
 Earl Wilson, Jr.
     Let My People Come (1974)
 Randal Wilson
     Pageant in Exile: "Duel" (1979)
 Sandy Wilson (1924–2014)
     The Boy Friend (1953); also a 1971 film
     Buccaneer (1953)
     Valmouth (1958)
     Call It Love (1960)
     Divorce Me, Darling! (1964)
     His Monkey Wife (1971)
     The Clapham Wonder (1978)
     Aladdin (1979)
 Marvin Winans (born 1958)
     Don't Get God Started (1987)
 Peter Winkler
     Professionally Speaking (1986); music also by Frederic Block, Ernst Muller
 Robert Winterberg (1884–1930)
     The Girl from Brazil (1916); music also by Sigmund Romberg
     The Lady in Red (1919)
 Jim Wise (1919–2000)
     Dames at Sea (1968)
 Judd Woldin (1925–2011)
     Railway with a Heart of Gold (1962)
     Raisin (1973)
     Pettycoat Lane (1978)
     Lorenzo (1982)
     Tatterdemalion (1985)
     Little Ham (1987)
     Jonah (1992)
     The Prince and the Pauper (1993)
 Tommy Wolf (1925–1979)
     The Nervous Set (1959)
 Jacques Wolfe (1896–1973)
     John Henry (1940)
 Gary Wong
     In Your Dreams (2000)
 David Wood
     The Old Man of Lochnager (1986)
 G. Wood
     F. Jasmine Addams (1971)
 Victoria Wood (1953–2016)
     Acorn Antiques (2005)
 Paul Woodfull (born 1958)
     I, Keano (2005)
 Benjamin Wooley
     Lumberjacks (2009)
 Guy Woolfenden (1937–2016)
     The Comedy of Errors (1976)
 Bill Wray
     EFX (1995); music also by others
 Robert Wright (1914–2005)
     Song of Norway (1944); music also by George Forrest, adapted from themes of Edvard Grieg; also a 1970 film
     Gypsy Lady (1946); music also by George Forrest, adapted from themes of Victor Herbert
     Magdalena (1948); music also by George Forrest, adapted from themes of Heitor Villa-Lobos
     Kismet (1953); music also by George Forrest, adapted from themes of Alexander Borodin; also a 1955 film
     The Love Doctor (1959); music also by George Forrest
     Kean (1961); music also by George Forrest
     Anya, "Anastasia" (1965); music also by George Forrest, adapted from themes of Sergei Rachmaninov
     The Great Waltz (1930); music also by George Forrest, adapted from Johann Strauss II
     Timbuktu! (1978); music also by George Forrest
     Grand Hotel (1989); music also by George Forrest, Maury Yeston
     Anastasia (revision of Anya) (1991); music also by George Forrest, adapted from themes of Sergei Rachmaninov
 Wilfred Wylam (1927–1997)
     Houdini: Man of Magic (1966)
 Barry Wyner
     Calvin Berger (2006)
 Laurence Mark Wythe (born 1974)
     Tomorrow Morning (2006)
     Through the Door (2008)

X

Y 
 David Yazbek (born 1960)
     The Full Monty (2000)
     Dirty Rotten Scoundrels (2004)
     Women on the Verge of a Nervous Breakdown (2010)
     The Band's Visit (2016)
 Gleb Yellin (1898–1983)
     Chauve-Souris of 1943 (1943)
 Maury Yeston (born 1945)
     Nine (1982); also a 2009 film
     One Two Three Four Five (1987)
     Goya: A Life In Song (1988)
     Grand Hotel (1989); music mostly by Robert Wright, George Forrest
     Phantom (1991)
     Titanic (1997)
     Death Takes a Holiday (2011)
 Douglas Yetter
     A Christmas Carol (1992)
 Lam Ming Yeung
     Snow.Wolf.Lake (1997); music also by Guo Sai Cheung, Dick Lee, Iskanada Ismail
 Vincent Youmans (1898–1946)
     Two Little Girls in Blue (1921); music also by Paul Lannin
     Wildflower (1923); music also by Herbert Stothart
     Mary Jane McKane (1923); music also by Herbert Stothart
     Lollipop (1924)
     No, No, Nanette (1925)
     Oh, Please! (1926)
     Hit the Deck (1927)
     Rainbow (1928)
     Great Day! (1929)
     Smiles (1930)
     Through the Years (1931)
     Take a Chance (1932); music also by Richard A. Whiting, Nacio Herb Brown
 Victor Young (1899–1956)
     Pardon Our French (1950)
     Seventh Heaven (1955)
 Virgil Young
     Corn (1997)
 Willie Fong Young
     American Passion (1983)

Z 
 Alan Zachary
     First Date (2012); music also by Michael Weiner
 Thomas Zaufke (born 1966)
     Schwestern im Geiste (2014)
 William Zeffiro
     The Road to Ruin
 Joseph Zellnik
     Trust Me (1990)
     Silken Cords (1993)
     The Uncrowned Queen of Ireland (1993)
     City of Dreams (1997)
     Yank! A WWII Love Story (2005)
 Victor Ziskin
     The Young Abe Lincoln (1961)
 Milan Zítka
     Mistr jazzu (2012)
 Emil Dean Zoghby (born 1942)
     Catch My Soul (1968); music also by Ray Pohlman
 Aaron Zorgel
     Giant Killer Shark: The Musical (2006); music also by Sam Sutherland, Graham Losee
 Charles Zwar (1911–1989)
     Blue Mountain Melody (1934)
     Swinging the Gate (1940)
     Sky High (1942)
     Sweetest and Lowest (1946); music also by others
     A La Carte (1947)
     Bet Your Life (1952); music also by Kenneth Leslie-Smith
     At the Lyric (1953)
     Marigold (1959)
     From A to Z (1960); music also by others
     All Square (1963)

See also
 List of musical theatre composers
 Lists of musicals

References
 Internet Broadway Database
 Internet Off Broadway Database
 London Theatre Database
 Cast Album Database
 The Guide to the Musical Theatre

 
 
composer M to Z